Constantino Teixeira (died 1988 in Bissau, Guinea-Bissau) was a Bissau-Guinean politician who was Prime Minister of Guinea-Bissau from 15 July 1978 to 27 September 1978.

References

External links
A Brief History of the PAIGC

1988 deaths
Prime Ministers of Guinea-Bissau
African Party for the Independence of Guinea and Cape Verde politicians
Year of birth missing